Louie Main Medina (born March 26, 1963) is a former designated hitter/first baseman in Major League Baseball who played for the Cleveland Indians (1988–89, 1991). He batted right-handed and threw left-handed.  He is currently working in the Kansas City Royals front office.

Playing career
In a three-season career, Medina was a .207 hitter (31-for-150) with 10 home runs and 16 RBI in 51 games played.

He also finished fourth in the Pacific Coast League with 81 RBI and hit .310, despite being disabled three weeks with an elbow injury. Medina joined the Cleveland Indians when rosters expanded in September. He hit his first two major league home runs off Tommy John at Yankee Stadium (September 7), then hit a home run which accounted for the only run in a 1–0 victory over the Boston Red Sox and Jeff Sellers, who flirted with a no-hitter through 7 innings (October 1). Medina hit .255 with six home runs and eight RBI in 51 at-bats following his late season promotion, but new injuries affected his playing time in the next two years. He appeared in only five games for Cleveland in 1991, his last major league season.

After that, he played in Japan for the Hiroshima Toyo Carp from 1993 to 1995 and ended his professional career with Class-A Lansing in 2000. Through 2006, Medina is one of 19 Colorado Springs players to hit 20 home runs during a regular season. He is the only player to do it twice.

Medina was one of those rare players who were not primarily pitchers in major league history who threw left-handed but batted right-handed. Medina also holds the trivial distinction of having the fewest career RBI among all players with exactly 10 career home runs.

Post-playing career
In 2001, Medina was hired by the Kansas City Royals to work in their front office. He was hired as Special Assistant to the General Manager/Player Personnel in 2007.

See also
Major leaguers who played for the Arizona State Sun Devils
Security Service Field

References

External links

Retrosheet
The Colorado Spring Gazette
The ESPN Baseball Encyclopedia – Gary Gillette, Peter Gammons, Pete Palmer. Publisher: Sterling Publishing, 2005. Format: Paperback, 1824pp. Language: English. 

American expatriate baseball players in Japan
Arizona State Sun Devils baseball players
Baseball players from Santa Monica, California
Cerritos Falcons baseball players
Cleveland Indians players
Hiroshima Toyo Carp players
Major League Baseball designated hitters
Major League Baseball first basemen
New York Mets players
1963 births
Living people
Alaska Goldpanners of Fairbanks players
Batavia Trojans players
Colorado Springs Sky Sox players
Omaha Royals players
Waterloo Indians players
Williamsport Bills players